Ernest Ambler (November 20, 1923 – February 17, 2017) was a British-American physicist who served as the Acting Under Secretary for Technology in the Department of Commerce (1988–89), as director of the United States' National Bureau of Standards (NBS, 1975–89), and as the first director of the United States' National Institute of Standards and Technology 1988–89.

Early life and education
Ernest Ambler was born in Bradford, England, in 1923. He received his Bachelor of Arts degree from the University of Oxford and went on to earn a D.Phil degree in 1953 from the same institution.

Career
In 1953 Ambler began work in the Cryogenic Physics Section of the United States' National Bureau of Standards, becoming section chief in 1961. In his early years at the NBS, Ambler was principal collaborator with Chien-Shiung Wu on what became the Wu experiment. He was awarded a Guggenheim Fellowship in 1962. He elected a Fellow of the American Physical Society in 1958.

In 1973 Ambler was appointed deputy director of the NBS and, in 1975, served with NBS director Richard W. Roberts as the U.S. delegation to the 15th General Conference on Weights and Measures in France. Ambler assumed the position of acting director in 1975, following the departure of Roberts. In 1977 he was nominated to the office of Director of the National Bureau of Standards by President Jimmy Carter and was confirmed to the post by the U.S. Senate the following year.

Ambler presided over the 1988 change of the NBS to the National Institute of Standards and Technology and became the first director of the new agency. Though he had announced his decision to retire effective April 1989, he agreed to a request by United States Secretary of Commerce William Verity to remain as director through the end of the year and to also accept appointment, on an acting basis, to the newly created position of Under Secretary for Technology in the Department of Commerce.

Personal life
Ambler was naturalized as a United States citizen in 1957. With his wife, Alice Virginia Seiler, he had two sons. He died at Hilton Head, South Carolina after a brief illness.

References

Fellows of the American Physical Society
NIST Directors
Scientists from Bradford
American physicists
Alumni of the University of Oxford
United States Department of Commerce officials
1923 births
2017 deaths
British emigrants to the United States
Recipients of the Order of Civil Merit (Korea)
English physicists
Recipients of the President's Award for Distinguished Federal Civilian Service
Naturalized citizens of the United States